Ishq Ibadat is a 2015 Pakistani romantic drama serial. It is based on the novel of Seema Ghazal, and was first broadcast by Hum TV on 21 July 2015. The series was directed by Fahim Burney and produced by Concepts & Fahim Burney.

Cast
Resham
Wahaj Ali
Anum Fayyaz
Farhan Saeed
Mariya Khan
Shafqat Cheema
Irfan Khoosat
Fareeha Jabeen
Khalid Butt
Tariq Tayyab
Raheela Agha as Khala Jan
Asma Abbas
Arsalan Rafiq

External links
 Official Playlist on Youtube
 Official Playlist on Dailymotion
 Official Facebook Page

Hum TV original programming
Urdu-language television shows
Pakistani drama television series
2015 Pakistani television series debuts
2014 Pakistani television series endings